Yitzhak Maron is a plasma physicist and a professor at the Weizmann Institute of Science. He was known for pioneering spectroscopic techniques to measure and characterize plasmas under extreme conditions (e.g. high-current, high-voltage, high-fields, short-duration) which won him the 2007 IEEE Plasma Science and Applications (PSAC) Award and the 2009 John Dawson Award for Excellence in Plasma Physics Research.

Early life and education 
Maron obtained a Ph.D. in Physics from the Weizmann Institute of Science in 1977. Upon graduation, he remained at the institution and worked as a postdoctoral fellow until 1980. He then moved to the Laboratory of Plasma Studies at Cornell University and became a Research Associate until 1984. Maron eventually returned to the Weizmann Institute of Science (WIS) as a professor in the Faculty of Physics and became head of the WIS Plasma Laboratory.

Honours and awards 
Maron was inducted as a fellow of the American Physical Society in 1996 and the Institute of Electrical and Electronics Engineers (IEEE) in 2003.

References 

Living people
21st-century  Israeli physicists
Plasma physicists
Fellow Members of the IEEE
Fellows of the American Physical Society
Year of birth missing (living people)
Academic staff of Weizmann Institute of Science
Weizmann Institute of Science alumni